Carnival House is a landmark office building in the city of Southampton, Hampshire, England.  It is a purpose-built headquarters for Carnival UK, the United Kingdom operating company of Carnival Corporation & plc, the world's largest cruise shipping company.  The building was officially opened on Sunday 19 July 2009.

Carnival House contains the head offices of P&O Cruises and Cunard Line. It also houses the UK offices of Princess Cruises, (headquartered in Santa Clarita, California) and Seabourn / Holland America Line (headquartered in Seattle, Washington). In addition Carnival Corporation's new build division is based in the building.

Architecture 
The building's five storeys, each named after a sea or ocean, contain  of office space between them, with a full-height atrium of  linking them together. The office space is open plan with separate rooms for private meetings, each named after a port the company serves and decorated with glazed navigational charts.

Prior to the construction of Carnival House the company's five brands, Cunard, P&O Cruises, Ocean Village, Princess and Yachts of Seabourn, each had separate headquarters buildings. The senior architect aimed to create "a collective identity for the new headquarters whilst also allowing each of the five brands to maintain their own distinct identity."

The distinctive wave patterns on the two panels of the building facade represent propagation of oceanic Rossby waves and were created by using real satellite data (sea surface height anomaly data from satellite altimetry) provided by Paolo Cipollini and Peter Challenor of the National Oceanography Centre, Southampton.

Statistics
Houses approximately 1,118 employees 
Brings together staff from five buildings in the city

See also

 Cunard Building

References

Carnival House
Buildings and structures in Southampton
Carnival Corporation & plc
Commercial buildings completed in 2009
HOK (firm) buildings
Corporate headquarters